Light Years is a 2015 British indie drama film written and directed by Esther May Campbell. It premiered in the International Critics’ Week section at the 72nd edition of the Venice Film Festival.

Cast 

 Beth Orton  as Moira
 Muhammet Uzuner as Dee
 Sophie Burton as Ramona 
 James Stuckey as Ewan 
 Mike Wright as Spirit 
 Zamira Fuller as Rose 
 Graeme Hogg as Roderick 
 Mickey Morris as Levi 
 Ewan Cooke as Nathan

References

External links 

2015 drama films
British drama films
2015 directorial debut films
2015 films
2010s English-language films
2010s British films